Ricardo Pardo Zancada (born 1935) is a Spanish former military commander. He was commanding officer and he was involved in the 1981 Spanish coup d'état attempt, so he was sentenced to twelve years in prison for military rebellion and pardoned in 1989.

References

1935 births
20th-century Spanish military personnel
People from Badajoz
Living people